Oakie may refer to: 

 Jack Oakie - American actor
 Leonard "Oakie" Brumm - hockey coach
 "Oakie" - SUNY-ESF costumed collegiate sports mascot
 Oakie Doke - American television program
 Oakie Boogie - western swing dance song
 Okie Blanchard - University of Wyoming head football coach
 Paul Oakenfold - English record producer and DJ

See also 
Okie (disambiguation)